Arcenant is a commune in the Côte-d'Or department in the Bourgogne-Franche-Comté region of eastern France.

The inhabitants of the commune are known as Arcenantais or Arcenantaises

Geography
Located in the Hautes-Côtes de Nuits, between Dijon and Beaune, Arcenant is 9 km west of Nuits-Saint-Georges and 16 km north of Beaune. Access to the commune is by the D25 road from Meuilley in the east passing through the village and continuing to join the D18 just west of the commune. The commune is heavily forested with some areas of farmland around the village and in the east.

The Raccordon rises west of the village and flows east through the village and on to join the Meuzin east of Meuilly.

Neighbouring communes and villages

History
On 15 June 1944 German troops together with men from the French Milice attacked a hundred Maquis resistance fighters holed up in a place called La Grotte (The Cave). Fighting resulted in 39 dead attackers and 6 dead Maquis with 4 wounded. The six dead were: Serge Boillereau, Ferruccio Borillo, Louis Evrard, Jean Fiorese, Jean Poulet, and André Rebill. This feat of arms continues to be celebrated each year on the site of the battle.

Administration

List of Successive Mayors

Demography
In 2017 the commune had 507 inhabitants.

Sites and monuments

The Trou du Duc (The Duke's Hole), a cave in the side of a cliff from which there is an extensive view, inhabited since antiquity
The Puits à terre (Land Well), a well masoned similar to a conventional well but for collecting the soil from vines carried by the runoff water. There was enough remaining to restore in place.
The Groseille well, a large underground chamber 560m across and 30m deep
The Ecartelot Gallo-Roman site in the Arcenant communal forest. Located on a Roman road, it included a farm and a pool for drinking water, rare in Côte-d'Or.
A Fortified Priory from the 13th century.
A Tree of Liberty in the central square of the village.
3 Lavoirs (Public Laundries) (19th century) are registered as historical monuments.
The Parish Church of Saint-Martin''' (14th century) contains several items that are registered as historical objects:
A Painting: Ecstasy of Saint Angèle Merici (17th century)
A Statue: Virgin and child (13th century)
A Group Sculpture: Charity of Saint Martin (15th century)
All the Monumental Paintings in the Choir (1885)

See also
Communes of the Côte-d'Or department

References

External links
 Arcenant on the National Geographic Institute website 
Arcenant on Géoportail, National Geographic Institute (IGN) website 
Arcenant on the 1750 Cassini Map

Communes of Côte-d'Or